was a Japanese daimyō of the Edo Period, who ruled the Ogi Domain.

He was the eldest son of Nabeshima Katsushige, the first lord of Saga Domain. Although he was the eldest son of Nabeshima clan, he was displaced in the line of succession for Saga Domain by his younger half-brother, Tadanao, whose mother was a daughter of shōgun Tokugawa Ieyasu, whilst his mother was a peasant woman named Oiwa. When his brother died, the office was succeeded by his nephew Mitsushige. He was a wise advisor to the third Tokugawa shogun Iemitsu.

In 1642, Ogi Domain was founded and Motoshige became its first daimyō.

He died in the third year of Jōō (1654), and his son, Naoyoshi, succeeded him.

References 

Hagakure by Yamamoto Tsunetomo

Daimyo
People of Edo-period Japan
Nabeshima clan
Year of birth unknown
Year of death unknown
1602 births